The Bluegrass Institute for Public Policy Solutions (BIPPS) is a libertarian think tank based in Bowling Green, Kentucky. BIPPS is a member of the State Policy Network.

Activities
In 2005, BIPPS launched KentuckyVotes.org, a website which provides information about Kentucky General Assembly bills, amendments and roll-call votes. The website was launched after BIPPS successfully pushed the state's Legislative Research Commission to post legislative roll call votes online.

Policy positions

Minimum wage
BIPPS has argued that an increase in the federal minimum wage would disproportionately harm Kentucky as well as young, low-skilled workers.

Education
The organization has cautioned against the use of certain performance testing ideas in public school assessment programs. BIPPS opposes the Common Core State Standards Initiative.

Public pensions
The organization has blamed the Kentucky General Assembly for the state of Kentucky's public pensions, which are among the worst-funded in the country.

References

External links

 Official website
 Organizational Profile – National Center for Charitable Statistics (Urban Institute)

Political and economic think tanks in the United States
Organizations based in Kentucky
Libertarian organizations based in the United States